The 2023 Peshawar mosque bombing was a terrorist attack that killed 101 people on 30 January 2023, at around 1:30 p.m. PKT, in the city of Peshawar, in the northwestern province of Khyber Pakhtunkhwa in Pakistan. The mosque is located inside a high-security compound that includes the headquarters of the provincial police force and a counterterrorism department. At the time of the bombing, between 300 and 400 police officers were offering their Zuhr prayers.

The attacker, who was wearing a police uniform and arrived on a motorcycle, managed to pass multiple police barricades undetected. He detonated a suicide vest while standing in the first row of those praying, causing a powerful blast that collapsed the mosque's roof. Over 101 people were killed, with 90% of the casualties being police officers.

The Jamaat-ul-Ahrar, a faction of the Tehrik-e-Taliban Pakistan (TTP), claimed responsibility for the bombing, stating that it was carried out to avenge the death of the founder and former leader of the Jamaat-ul-Ahrar. The main TTP group, through its spokesperson, later denied involvement but did not comment on statements made by Jamaat-ul-Ahrar.

The bombing was widely condemned both domestically and internationally, with leaders from around the world condemning the attack and expressing condolences for the victims and their families. The United Nations Secretary General's spokeswoman called the bombing "particularly abhorrent" as it took place in a place of worship.

Background 

In 2004, Islamist attacks intensified into a war between insurgents and the Pakistani government in northwest Pakistan. The war scaled down to a low-intensity conflict in 2017. Many insurgent attacks and bombings have been carried out in Peshawar, which is the capital of and largest city in Khyber Pakhtunkhwa, in northwest Pakistan. These include major attacks at mosques in 2013, 2015, and 2022.

Bombing
The mosque is located inside a high-security compound that includes the headquarters of the provincial police force and a counterterrorism department. On 30 January 2023, the suicide bomber passed multiple barricades manned by the local police without being detected – a preliminary investigation suggests that he wore a police uniform and arrived on a motorcycle. Between 300 and 400 police officials were present in the mosque at the time to offer their Zuhr prayers.

The bomber triggered the suicide vest at around 1:30pm while standing in the first row of those praying, causing a powerful blast which collapsed the mosque's roof. A policeman who survived the bombing said that he saw "a huge burst of flames" before he was surrounded by a plume of black dust. Over 100 people were killed and twice as many were injured; 90% of the casualties were police officers.

Perpetrator 
Following the bombing, Omar Mukaram Khurasani, the current emir of the Jamaat-ul-Ahrar faction and a member of the Tehrik-e-Taliban Pakistan's (TTP) leadership council, claimed responsibility for the bombing; he said that the bombing was carried out to avenge the death of Omar Khalid Khorasani, his brother, founder and former leader of the faction, who was responsible for the 2014 Peshawar school massacre. Sarbakaf Mohmand from the TTP Mohamand chapter confirmed that the bomber's name was Huzaifa and he was 25 years old, and that they will soon release a photo of the bomber with more details.

Subsequently, the main TTP group, through its spokesperson, denied involvement. TTP's spokesperson, however, did not comment on earlier statements made by TTP officials such as Sarbakaf Mohmand and Omar Mukaram Khurasani, who had claimed responsibility for the blast.

The TTP is an umbrella organization of various Islamist armed terrorist groups operating along the Afghan–Pakistani border. Bill Roggio believes that the Jamaat-ul-Ahrar might have launched the suicide bomber's attack without the knowledge and approval of its parent organization but given the organization of the TTP, and with the history of these two groups, it is more likely that the TTP was aware of the bombing. Bill Roggio further adds that TTP may be relying on the fact that the relationships between the TTP central leadership and its various factions are complex and often confusing to deny its involvement in the attack.

Reactions

Domestic 
Pakistani Prime Minister Shehbaz Sharif condemned the bombing, stating that the bombing is incompatible with Islam and that the entirety of Pakistan stands against the "menace of terrorism". Former prime minister Imran Khan condemned the bombing, saying, "It is imperative we improve our intelligence gathering and properly equip our police forces to combat the growing threat of terrorism."

International 
The bombing drew condemnation from India, Canada, China, the United States, Saudi Arabia, the United Arab Emirates, Qatar, and the United Nations, with Secretary General António Guterres' spokeswoman saying "it is particularly abhorrent that such an attack occurred at a place of worship."

See also

 2014 Peshawar school massacre
 Sectarian violence in Pakistan
 Terrorism in Pakistan
 List of terrorist incidents in 2023
 Terrorist incidents in Pakistan in 2023
 Timeline of Peshawar

References

2023 in Khyber Pakhtunkhwa
2020s building bombings
2020s crimes in Khyber Pakhtunkhwa
2020s in Peshawar
2020s murders in Pakistan
21st-century mass murder in Pakistan
Attacks on buildings and structures in 2023
Attacks on buildings and structures in Peshawar
Building bombings in Khyber Pakhtunkhwa
Insurgency in Khyber Pakhtunkhwa
Islamic terrorist incidents in 2023
January 2023 events in Pakistan
January 2023 crimes in Asia
Khyber Pakhtunkhwa Police
Mass murder in 2023
Mass murder in Peshawar
Mosque bombings in Pakistan
Suicide bombings in 2023
Suicide bombings in Peshawar
Terrorist incidents in Pakistan in 2023